This is a list of population genetics projects.

Multiple populations 

 1000 Genomes Project
 HapMap Project

Population based projects

See also 
 List of genetics-related topics

References 

Genetic genealogy
Population genetics projects
Population genetics
Population genetics